The (Roman Catholic) Diocese of Yoro (Latin: Dioecesis Yorensis) covers the department Yoro in Honduras. It is a suffragan diocese of the Archdiocese of San Pedro Sula.

The diocese was erected on 19 September 2005 with territory taken from the archdiocese of Tegucigalpa and was a suffragan of that archdiocese until the erection of the metropolitan province of San Pedro Sula in 2023. Jean-Louis Giasson, P.M.E. was appointed as the first bishop of the diocese. The Cathedral in the city of El Progreso, Yoro.

History
Formerly in the Diocese of Tegucigalpa, Yoro was formed due to the extent of the territory covered, under papal order by Benedict XVI on 18 September 2005. The Canadian priest Juan Luis Giasson, was made Bishop. On the death of Bishop Juan Luis Giasson,  Pope Francis appointed Hector David Garcia Osorio as senior official of the diocese on July 3, 2014.

Parishes
The diocese has twelve parishes and 25 priests.
 Our Lady of Mercy, El Progreso.
 San Ignacio de Loyola, El Progreso.
 Our Lady of Suyapa
 San Antonio de Padua, Urraco.
 Santa Rita de Casia, Santa Rita.
 Our Lady of Carmen, El Negrito.
 St. Francis of Assisi, Toyos-The bold.
 Our Lady, Morazán.
 St. Peter the Apostle, Yorito.
 Immaculate Conception, Sulaco-Victoria.
 St. James, Yoro.
 San Jorge Olanchito
.

Bishops
Juan Luis Obispo Giassón (2005–2014)
Bishop David Garcia Hector Osorio (2014–present)

Ordinaries
Jean-Louis Giasson, P.M.E. (2005–2014)

External links
catholic-hierarchy.org

Yoro
Yoro
Yoro
Roman Catholic Ecclesiastical Province of Tegucigalpa